Juan Zorrilla de San Martín (28 December 1855 – 3 November 1931) was a Uruguayan epic poet and political figure. He is referred to as the "National Poet of Uruguay".

Well-known poems
Two of Zorrilla's best-known poems are Tabaré (the national poem for Uruguayans) and La leyenda patria (The Fatherland Legend). He also wrote the Hymn to the Tree (Himno al Arbol) a well-known Spanish poem later made a song in several Latin-American countries.

Personal background

As a political figure Juan Zorrilla de San Martín served as a Deputy for Montevideo from 1888-91, and served as Ambassador several periods.

He was twice widowed, and left 13 children when he died, one of whom was José Luis Zorrilla de San Martín. His grandson, Alejandro Zorrilla de San Martín, was to serve as a prominent Deputy, Minister and Senator. One of his granddaughters was actress  China Zorrilla. Another granddaughter, Guma Zorrilla, was a theater costume designer.

Honours
Zorrilla's home in Montevideo is now a museum.

He was featured in the 20,000 pesos banknote (1989-1991), and is featured on the 20 pesos note (since 1994).

See also
 List of Uruguayan writers
 Politics of Uruguay
 List of political families#Uruguay

References

External links

 
 

19th-century Uruguayan poets
Uruguayan male poets
1855 births
1931 deaths
People from Montevideo
Uruguayan diplomats
Ambassadors of Uruguay to France
Ambassadors of Uruguay to the Holy See
Ambassadors of Uruguay to Spain
Members of the Chamber of Representatives of Uruguay
Burials at the Central Cemetery of Montevideo
Catholic poets
19th-century male writers